Belaganj Assembly constituency is an assembly constituency for Bihar Legislative Assembly in Gaya district of Bihar, India. It comes under Gaya (Lok Sabha constituency). After 2009 delimitation, Belaganj Block and most parts of the Sadar Block come under Belaganj Constituency. 

For the last 30 years excluding June- 1998 to February- 2000, RJD leader Surendra Prasad Yadav is Belaganj MLA.

No major developments have taken place in the constituency in last 30 years. There are not any good colleges or hospitals in the constituency. Most of the constituents are migrant workers.

Caste Balance 
Muslims and Yadav constitute two thirds of the voters in the constituency. Upper castes, dalits and non-Yadav OBCs are one third of the voters.

Members of Legislative Assembly
List of members elected from Belaganj to Bihar Legislative Assembly.

Election results

2020

References

External links
 

Assembly constituencies of Bihar